Bryn Desmond Hall (born 3 February 1992) is a New Zealand rugby union player who currently plays as a halfback for  in New Zealand's domestic Mitre 10 Cup and the  in the international Super Rugby competition.

Early career

Born and raised in Auckland, he was educated at St Peter's College where he played first XV rugby, captaining them in his senior year in 2010. After graduation, he went on to play club rugby for Northcote in North Harbour's club rugby competition.

Senior career

Hall broke into the North Harbour team during the 2012 ITM Cup while aged just 20. He played 9 times for the men from Auckland's North Shore and scored 35 points which included 3 tries as they finished bottom the Championship log with just 1 win in 10 games. 2013 saw him establish himself as the province's first choice halfback, playing in all 10 of their games during the season as they once again finished in last place.

2014 saw some improvement from Harbour as they finished 5th out of 7 teams in the ITM Cup Championship and Hall continued to be first pick in the number 9 jersey, playing 9 times.   He was named as team captain and was an ever present in 2015 as Harbour once again finished in 5th place, just outside the promotion play-off places.

Super Rugby

Strong performances in an under-performing North Harbour side in 2012 brought him to the attention of local Super Rugby franchise, the  who named him in their squad for the 2013 Super Rugby season. He made his Super Rugby debut in Round 2 of the season, coming on as a 63rd minute replacement in the 34–15 win over the Crusaders at Eden Park, however that would turn out to be his only appearance for the year as a broken jaw and glandular fever ensured that he found himself third in the pecking order for the halfback jersey behind All Black Piri Weepu and 's Jamison Gibson-Park.

In 2014, he earned a lot more game time and had nailed down the starting halfback spot for the Blues by the end of the season, dislodging the far more experienced Weepu.   However, all the momentum he'd built up through 2014 was lost when a broken foot picked up playing club rugby forced him to miss the entire 2015 campaign, but, fully fit in 2016, new head-coach Tana Umaga made him the franchise's first choice number 9 once more and he went on to play in all 15 of their matches during a slightly disappointing season which ended with them in 11th place in the overall standings.

In June 2016, it was announced that Hall would move south to join the Christchurch-based Crusaders for 2017 where he would compete with former New Zealand under-20 international Mitchell Drummond for a starting berth in the wake of the departure of the experienced Andy Ellis.

International

Hall was a New Zealand Schools representative in 2010 and then along with future Blues team-mate Steve Luatua, went on to co-captain the New Zealand Under-20 side which finished as runner-up in the 2012 IRB Junior World Championship in South Africa.

Career honours

North Harbour

Mitre 10 Cup Championship – 2016

Super Rugby statistics

Controversy

Hall while on Sky Sports show "Kick off" referred to fellow Crusader teammate Jack Goodhue as "a Jew" for attempting to get a women's magazine to pay for his wedding. These comments were labelled as  "casual racism" by the BSA but the slur was not serious enough to warrant a breach of broadcasting standards

Notes

1992 births
Living people
People educated at St Peter's College, Auckland
New Zealand rugby union players
Blues (Super Rugby) players
North Harbour rugby union players
Rugby union scrum-halves
Rugby union players from Auckland
Crusaders (rugby union) players
Shizuoka Blue Revs players